Moresnet or Neutral Moresnet is a former neutral territory existing from 1816 to 1920 in modern-day Belgium.

Moresnet may also refer to:
 Moresnet (village), in the municipality of Plombières, Belgium
 Neu-Moresnet, part of the municipality of Kelmis